Poulton Curve was a halt on the Fleetwood-to-Blackpool railway line in Lancashire, England.

On 1 July 1899 a new curve was opened at Poulton-le-Fylde to complete the triangle of lines between Kirkham,  and Blackpool. Poulton Curve Halt was opened on this section on 1 February 1909. It closed on 1 July 1952.

References

 Suggitt, G. (2003, revised 2004) Lost Railways of Lancashire, Countryside Books, Newbury, p. 38
 Welch, M.S. (2004) Lancashire Steam Finale, Runpast Publishing, Cheltenham, p. 27

Disused railway stations in the Borough of Wyre
Buildings and structures in Poulton-le-Fylde
Former Preston and Wyre Joint Railway stations
Railway stations in Great Britain opened in 1909
Railway stations in Great Britain closed in 1952